The golden-headed manakin (Ceratopipra erythrocephala) is a small passerine bird which breeds in tropical Central and South America in both wet and dry forests, secondary growth and plantations. Males are entirely black apart from a golden head, yellow bill, white and red thighs and pink legs. Females and juveniles are olive-green with pink legs. At breeding time, males are involved in a cooperative lekking behaviour during which they jump, slide and dart from perch to perch. This is a fairly common species with a wide range, and the International Union for Conservation of Nature has rated its conservation status as being of "least concern".

Description

Like other manakins, the golden-headed manakin is a compact, brightly coloured forest bird, typically 3.7 in (9.4 cm) long and weighing 0.44 oz (12.5 g). The adult male is black apart from a golden cap, white and red thighs, pink legs and a yellowish bill. The female and young males are olive-green and resemble female white-bearded manakins, but are smaller, shorter-tailed and have pinkish (not bright orange) legs. Apart from the buzzing display song (see below), the golden-headed manakin has a number of other calls, including a buzzing  pir pir prrrrrt.

Distribution and habitat
This manakin is found from Panama, Colombia and Trinidad south and east to the Guianas and Brazil and northern Peru. It is not found south of the Amazon or the Ucayali Rivers.
It is a common bird of forests, second growth and plantations. Their upper altitudinal limit is usually about 3,600 ft (1,100 m), but they are occasionally found has high as c.5,000 ft (1,500 m) ASL. Like other manakins they eat fruit and some insects and spiders.

Ecology
Male golden-headed manakins give a fascinating courtship display at a communal lek. Each male occupies a horizontal perch 20–40 ft (6–12 m) high and rapidly jumps, slides, or darts to other perches. The display is accompanied by the whirring of the wings and a buzzing zit-zit call. Groups of up to 12 birds may perform together. The female builds a shallow cup nest low in a tree; two brown-mottled yellowish eggs are laid, and incubated entirely by the female for about 16–17 days.

This bird has a large range and is thus considered a species of Least Concern by the IUCN.

Footnotes

References
 
 BirdLife International (BLI) (2007): Golden-headed Manakin Species Factsheet. Retrieved 2008-FEB-28.
 ffrench, Richard; O'Neill, John Patton & Eckelberry, Don R. (1991): A guide to the birds of Trinidad and Tobago (2nd edition). Comstock Publishing, Ithaca, N.Y.. 
 Hilty, Steven L. (2003): Birds of Venezuela. Christopher Helm, London. 
 Salaman, Paul G.W.; Stiles, F. Gary; Bohórquez, Clara Isabel; Álvarez-R., Mauricio; Umaña, Ana María; Donegan, Thomas M. & Cuervo, Andrés M. (2002): New and noteworthy bird records from the east slope of the Andes of Colombia. Caldasia 24(1): 157–189. PDF fulltext

golden-headed manakin
Birds of Panama
Birds of Colombia
Birds of Venezuela
Birds of Trinidad and Tobago
Birds of the Guianas
Birds of the Amazon Basin
Birds of the Ecuadorian Amazon
Birds of the Peruvian Amazon
golden-headed manakin
golden-headed manakin